Sphingomonas faeni  is a Gram-negative bacteria from the genus of Sphingomonas which has been isolated from indoor dusts from animal sheds in Finland.

References

Further reading

External links
Type strain of Sphingomonas faeni at BacDive -  the Bacterial Diversity Metadatabase

faeni
Bacteria described in 2003